The chestnut-headed oropendola (Psarocolius wagleri) is a New World tropical icterid bird. The scientific name of the species commemorates Johann Georg Wagler, who established Psarocolius, the oropendola genus.

Description
The wings are very long. Adult males are mainly black with a chestnut head and rump and a tail which is bright yellow apart from two dark central feathers. The iris is blue and the long bill is whitish. Females are similar, but smaller and duller than males. Young birds are duller than adults and have brown eyes. The populations south of an area around the border of Honduras and Nicaragua are sometimes separated as a subspecies P. w. ridgwayi, but the separation of this form has been questioned.

The distinctive songs of the male include a gurgle followed by a crash guu-guu-PHRRRRTTT. Both sexes have loud chek and chuk calls.

Range and ecology
It is a resident breeder in the Caribbean coastal lowlands from southern Mexico to central Costa Rica, both slopes of southern Costa Rica and Panama, and the Pacific lowlands of Colombia and north-eastern Ecuador. Though it usually stays below  ASL, it has also been recorded as much as  ASL, for example in the Serranía de las Quinchas of Colombia. It may in fact be more common at such high altitudes at particular times or in particular places, but its altitudinal movements are insufficiently understood. The species is common across its large range and not considered threatened by the IUCN.

The chestnut-headed oropendola inhabits forest canopy, edges and old plantations. It is a quite common bird in parts of its range, seen in small flocks foraging in trees for large insects, fruit and berries.

There may be 40–50 females and only 4–5 males in a colony. The female lays two dark-marked pale blue eggs which hatch in 17 days and fledge in 30. Botflies (Oestridae) are the main cause of nestling mortality, but brood parasitism by giant cowbirds (Molothrus oryzivorus) also occurs, and the young cowbirds will feed on the fly larvae.

Footnotes

References

External links

 
 
 
 

chestnut-headed oropendola
Birds of Central America
Birds of the Tumbes-Chocó-Magdalena
chestnut-headed oropendola
chestnut-headed oropendola